James G. Basker is an American scholar, writer, and educational leader.  He is president of the Gilder Lehrman Institute and Richard Gilder Professor of Literary History at Barnard College, Columbia University.

Biography
He studied English at Harvard College (Phi Beta Kappa) and Cambridge University, and graduated from Oxford University as a Rhodes Scholar, with a D. Phil in English. Basker is currently the Richard Gilder Professor in Literary History at Barnard College, Columbia University, having previously taught at Harvard, Cambridge and NYU.  He is also the president of the Gilder Lehrman Institute of American History, founder of the Oxbridge Academic Programs, a fellow of the Society of American Historians, and a member of the American Antiquarian Society. He was elected to the board of the American Association of Rhodes Scholars in 2007.

Publications 
Basker’s scholarly work focuses on 18th Century literature, specifically the life and writings of Samuel Johnson and the history of slavery and abolition.

 American Antislavery Writings: Colonial Beginnings to Emancipation, New York, NY: The Library of America, 2012.
 Amazing Grace: An Anthology of Poems About Slavery, 1660-1810. Yale University Press, 2002.
 Early American Abolitionists: A Collection of Anti-slavery Writings, 1760-1820. The Gilder Lehrman Institute of American History, New York, 2005.
 Why Documents Matter: American Originals and Historical Imagination (Selections From the Gilder Lehrman Collection). The Gilder Lehrman Institute of American History, New York, 2008.
 Tobias Smollett, Critic and Journalist . University of Delaware Press, 1988.
 Tradition in Transition: Women Writers, Marginal Texts, and the Eighteenth-Century Canon. OUP Oxford, 1997.
 The Adventures of Roderick Random (The Works of Tobias Smollett). University of Georgia Press, 2014.

Personal
Dr. Basker currently lives in New York City with his wife, Angela Vallot. They have two daughters, Anne and Katherine.

References

External links
 To see Dr. Basker discuss American Antislavery Writings, click here.

American educational theorists
Living people
Harvard College alumni
American Rhodes Scholars
Barnard College faculty
Alumni of the University of Oxford
Alumni of the University of Cambridge
Year of birth missing (living people)